The 1974–75 DFB-Pokal was the 32nd season of the annual German football cup competition. The DFB-Pokal is considered the second-most important club title in German football after the Bundesliga championship. 128 teams competed in the tournament of seven rounds which began on 7 September 1974 and ended on 21 June 1975. In the final Eintracht Frankfurt defeated MSV Duisburg 1–0, thereby defending their title from the previous season. It was Frankfurt's second victory in the cup.

Participating clubs
 The following teams qualified for the first round.

Matches

First round

Replays

Second round

Replays

Third round

Replay

Round of 16

Replays

Quarter-finals

Semi-finals

Final

References

External links
 Official site of the DFB 
 Kicker.de 

1974-75
1974–75 in German football cups